Matheus Sousa de Jesus (born 10 April 1997), known as Matheus Jesus, is a Brazilian footballer who plays as a defensive midfielder for Ponte Preta on loan from Corinthians.

Club career

Ponte Preta
Born in Salvador, Bahia, Matheus Jesus joined Ponte Preta's youth setup in 2015, after being released by Flamengo. Promoted to the former's main squad in January 2016 by manager Eduardo Baptista, he made his senior debut on 5 May by starting in a 1–0 Copa do Brasil away win against Genus.

Matheus Jesus scored his first senior goal on 13 May 2016, netting the first in a 3–0 home win against Genus. Two days later he made his Série A debut by starting in a 0–0 away draw against Figueirense, and extended his contract until December 2020 on 18 May.

Matheus Jesus finished his first season with 24 league appearances, as his side finished eighth and just four points shy of a Copa Libertadores qualification. His good performances drew interest from clubs across Europe, including Sporting CP and Fiorentina.

After featuring regularly in 2017 Campeonato Paulista, which his side finished second, Matheus Jesus was separated from the first team squad in May 2017, due to an "indiscipline problem".

Estoril
On 28 June 2017, Matheus Jesus signed a five-year contract with Primeira Liga side G.D. Estoril Praia. Initially linked to a loan move to São Paulo, the deal later collapsed.

Santos (loan)
On 18 July 2017, Matheus Jesus joined Santos on loan until December 2018. A backup to Alison and Renato, he only featured in 14 matches for the club.

Gamba Osaka (loan)
On 7 March 2018, it was announced that Matheus Jesus would join Japanese side Gamba Osaka on loan from Santos for the 2018 season where he would be coached by his compatriot Levir Culpi. On 13 August 2018, his loan was cancelled.

Portimonense (loan)
On 31 August 2018, Matheus Jesus joined Portuguese side Portimonense on loan for the campaign. He would only appear in one match for the club before leaving in December.

Oeste (loan)
On 7 January 2019, Matheus Jesus was announced as one of Oeste's 17 signings for the 2019 season. He impressed during his time at Rubrão, scoring six goals and being the club's top goalscorer (and the second overall) in the 2019 Campeonato Paulista.

Corinthians (loan)
On 9 May 2019, Matheus Jesus agreed to a loan contract with Corinthians until December, with a fixed buyout clause and an arranged permanent deal until 2023.

International career
Matheus Jesus made one appearance for the Brazil under-20 side in 2016, replacing Caio Henrique after 75 minutes in a friendly against England.

Career statistics

References

External links

1997 births
Living people
Sportspeople from Salvador, Bahia
Brazilian footballers
Association football midfielders
Campeonato Brasileiro Série A players
Associação Atlética Ponte Preta players
Santos FC players
Sport Club Corinthians Paulista players
Red Bull Bragantino players
G.D. Estoril Praia players
Gamba Osaka players
Portimonense S.C. players
Oeste Futebol Clube players
Brazilian expatriate footballers
Brazilian expatriate sportspeople in Portugal
Brazilian expatriate sportspeople in Japan
Expatriate footballers in Portugal
Expatriate footballers in Japan